Aureopterix is a genus of small primitive metallic moths in the family Micropterigidae.

Species
Aureopterix micans Gibbs, 2010
Aureopterix sterops (Turner, 1921)

References

Micropterigidae
Moth genera